Mykhaylo Kaluhin (born 20 November 1994) is a Ukrainian footballer who plays as a centre-back for Abdysh-Ata Kant.

Career
In February 2016, he signed a two-year contract with Belarusian Premier League club Krumkachy Minsk.

External links 
 
 
 

1994 births
Living people
Footballers from Kharkiv
Ukrainian footballers
Association football defenders
Ukrainian expatriate footballers
Expatriate footballers in Slovakia
Expatriate footballers in Belarus
Expatriate footballers in Armenia
Ukrainian expatriate sportspeople in Slovakia
Ukrainian expatriate sportspeople in Belarus
Ukrainian expatriate sportspeople in Armenia
Ukrainian expatriate sportspeople in Kyrgyzstan
Armenian Premier League players
FC Illichivets-2 Mariupol players
FC Metalist Kharkiv players
FK Bodva Moldava nad Bodvou players
2. Liga (Slovakia) players
FC Bukovyna Chernivtsi players
FC Krumkachy Minsk players
FC Torpedo-BelAZ Zhodino players
FC Isloch Minsk Raion players
FC Ararat Yerevan players
FC Dnyapro Mogilev players
FC Chornomorets Odesa players
FC Rukh Lviv players
FC Hirnyk-Sport Horishni Plavni players
FC Olimpiya Savyntsi players
FC Abdysh-Ata Kant players